Thumb Bandits was a British entertainment television series that aired on Channel 4 from 2001 to 2002 and was presented by Aleks Krotoski and Iain Lee.

The show ran for 1 series of 13 episodes and featured location film items, studio based reviews and news. The series was in a late night time slot on Channel 4. The series did get reasonable viewing figures of around 900,000. Studio excerpts were shot in an abandoned hospital made into a TV studio in Glasgow.

External links 
Review of Thumb Bandits

2001 British television series debuts
2002 British television series endings
Channel 4 original programming
Television shows about video games
Video gaming in the United Kingdom